Stanley Raymond Mickelsen (1895 – 1966) was an American military leader. Born in Minnesota, and a graduate of the University of Minnesota, Mickelsen joined the Army in 1917.

As a young officer Mickelsen commanded coastal artillery units, including the 74th Coast Artillery Regiment and the 47th Artillery Brigade. During World War II, he served on the War Department General Staff, but later commanded an antiaircraft brigade. In 1943, he was assigned as Commandant of the Anti-Aircraft Artillery Training Center at Fort Bliss, Texas. From September 1, 1947 to October 1, 1949 he was Assistant Commandant of the Army Field Artillery School. From 1952 to 1957 he was commanding general of the U.S. Army Air Defense Command. He retired in 1957 with the rank of lieutenant general.

During his career the Army moved from air defense based on guns to advanced anti-aircraft missiles and anti-ballistic missile systems. The Stanley R. Mickelsen Safeguard Complex, a facility for  ballistic missile defense, was named in his honor.

References

Mickelsen Safeguard Complex, introduction

External links

Generals of World War II

1895 births
1966 deaths
Military personnel from Minnesota
United States Army generals
United States Army personnel of World War I
United States Army generals of World War II
University of Minnesota alumni